Freeze Frame is a psychological thriller-mystery film written and directed by John Simpson. In the lead role is the comedian Lee Evans. The film follows the story of Sean Veil (Evans), who becomes paranoid that there is a conspiracy against him after he is accused of a triple murder. He starts filming every moment of his life to provide himself an alibi. The film was rated "R" by the Motion Picture Association of America.

Plot
In 1994, Sean Veil is acquitted of charges relating to an infamous triple murder. He becomes paranoid that the police are trying to frame him for this and other crimes. A book based on his trial called Darkness Invisible is released. The author, Saul Seger, accuses Veil. Veil responds by filming every moment of his life to provide himself with an alibi. However, some of his tapes go missing. Veil goes on the run, tries to create an alibi and investigates the conspiracy against him. Katie Carter, a young reporter, says she would like to help Veil prove his innocence but Veil refuses her offer.

Veil is assaulted and apprehended by police wishing to interrogate him. Veil shows detectives Emeric (who is dying of lung cancer) and Mountjoy the many tapes he has made. Emeric and Mountjoy leave but Veil finds one of his tapes is missing. Veil then becomes the prime suspect in the murder of a prostitute.

At the morgue, the prostitute's body is mysteriously replaced by that of Seger, who has had his throat cut. Veil is convicted and sentenced to 30 years' imprisonment. However, one of Veil's tapes proves his innocence and he is released. Veil returns home and is shocked to find Seger alive. Both Carter and Seger are guilty of serious crimes, for which they tried to frame Veil. Veil asks Seger who is trying to frame him but Seger refuses to say. In fact, Carter hired the prostitute to steal one of Veil's tapes and then killed her by accident. Carter's father killed his wife and family and then killed himself when he found his wife was having an affair. By coincidence, Veil was at the murder scene, leaving his fingerprints. Carter shoots Seger dead, then knocks Veil out. Waking up, Veil finds Carter raping him in order to frame him; she destroys his tapes afterwards. However, Carter finds herself feeling too guilty for her actions to kill Veil.

Emeric arrives at Veil's home. An altercation leaves both Emeric and Carter dead. Detective Mountjoy arrives. Veil shows him what happened as he has filmed the events on his webcam. Before the film ends, Veil makes a list of things to remember: whom to trust, how to be careful, how to be a step ahead, and how to prove one's innocence. He must never stop filming himself because being off camera is "like being off guard".

Cast
 Lee Evans as Sean Veil
 Ian McNeice as Forensic Profiler Saul Serger
 Colin Salmon as Detective Mountjoy
 Seán McGinley as Detective Louis Emeric
 Rachael Stirling as Katie Carter
 Rachel O'Riordan as Mary Shaw
 Andrew Wilson as Covert Cameraman
 Andrea Grimason as Susan Jasper
 Martin McShary as Sam Jasper
 Gabriella Henriette as Moira Jasper
 Emily Anthony as Maggie Jasper
 Ryan McKenna as Reporter (Credit only)
 Hawk Younkins as Carter (uncredited)

Production
The film was shot in Crumlin Road Jail in Belfast, Northern Ireland on a budget of $2,000,000.

Release
Freeze Frame was released on 18 June 2004.  Box Office Mojo reports it earned $1,100 at the domestic box office and $38,570 in the UK. The Numbers reports a worldwide box office return of $91,062. It was released on DVD on 18 January 2005.

Reception
Freeze Frame received five positive and one negative review among the six reviews collected by Rotten Tomatoes and a score of 55 out of 100 from Metacritic based on 5 reviews, signifying "mixed or average reviews". Critical appreciation went to Evans who had previously played comedic roles. David Rooney of Variety said Simpson's direction was "executed in the style of early David Fincher" and said Evans' performance was "gripping". Debbie Wiseman's score, cinematographer Mark Garrett's choice of cameras and lenses and Simon Thorne's "sharp editing" were also mentioned. Kevin Crust of the Los Angeles Times wrote that Freeze Frame is a "stylish and dystopian allegory concerned with Orwellian surveillance and intrusive government".  Crust called Evans' performance "riveting". Neil Smith of the BBC wrote that the film "starts off stylish and ingenious but becomes a disappointing hodgepodge of risible overacting and transparent plotting".

See also
List of films featuring surveillance

References

External links
 
 
 Freeze Frame at Rotten Tomatoes
 

2004 films
2004 psychological thriller films
British psychological thriller films
Northern Irish films
Films about security and surveillance
Fiction set in 1994
British crime thriller films
British crime drama films
British mystery thriller films
British neo-noir films
Irish crime thriller films
Films about suicide
Films about murder
American thriller drama films
American mystery thriller films
American crime thriller films
Fiction about familicide
Films about rape
2000s English-language films
2000s American films
2000s British films